XHMTCH-TDT is the Multimedios Televisión television station in Ciudad Juárez, Chihuahua, Mexico. The station is owned by Grupo Multimedios.

History

Multimedios Televisión had an off-and-on presence in the Ciudad Juárez market, primarily by way of El Paso low-power station K40FW (later K26KJ and K26KJ-D, now K27OJ-D), which began broadcasting Multimedios in 2006 and converted to digital in July 2015.

On June 23, 2017, Cabada Holdings, LLC (formerly Broadcast Group, Ltd.) agreed to sell K26KJ-D's license to Martin Lorenzo Smith, Grupo Multimedios' international public relations and sales' director in the U.S. This made K26KJ-D the first television station owned and operated by an American employee of Grupo Multimedios. The deal was approved by the FCC on August 9, 2017, but consummation did not occur until March 7, 2018.

In July 2017, K26KJ-D began carrying a feed of XHABC-TDT, a local television station in Chihuahua, Chihuahua, on its third digital subchannel. This arrangement brought Canal 28, known as "ABC Televisión" in the Juárez area, to over-the-air viewers in Juárez for the first time, complementing XHABC's own transmitters in Chihuahua and Ciudad Cuauhtémoc. Canal 28 provides the feed to XHMTCH-TDT through its for-profit arm, Unidad Corporativa de Televisión, S.A. de C.V.

Multimedios Televisión bid for and won a television station in Ciudad Juárez as part of the IFT's IFT-6 television station auction in 2017. This station, XHMTCH-TDT RF 28 (virtual channel 6), came on the air in October 2018. It was quickly authorized to move to the Cerro del Indio transmitter site, sharing space with XHIJ-TDT and the Imagen Televisión transmitter for Juárez.

In November 2020, Multimedios replaced its main programming on K27OJ-D with Voz y Visión TV, a Spanish-language religious TV channel.

Digital television

The 6.2 and 6.3 channels are encoded in MPEG-4/H.264 video. Channel 6.4 is in MPEG-2.

On August 21, 2019, the IFT approved the substitution of shopping channel CV Shopping for Teleritmo on nine Multimedios stations, including XHMTCH, to January 2023

References

HMTCH-TDT
Canal 6 (Mexico) affiliates
Television channels and stations established in 2018
2018 establishments in Mexico